Amaldu is a small village in the patti - dabralsyun of Pauri Garhwal district of the Uttarakhand state of India.

Villages in Pauri Garhwal district